William John Monson, 1st Viscount Oxenbridge PC (18 February 1829 – 16 April 1898), known as The Lord Monson between 1862 and 1886, was a British Liberal politician. He served as Captain of the Yeomen of the Guard between 1880 and 1885 and in 1886 under William Ewart Gladstone.

Background
Monson was the son of William Monson, 6th Baron Monson, and Eliza, daughter of Edmund Larken. The diplomat Sir Edmund Monson, 1st Baronet, was his younger brother. He was educated at Windlesham House School (1838-42), Eton College and Christ Church, Oxford.

Political career
Monson was elected Member of Parliament for Reigate in 1858, a seat he held until he succeeded his father in the peerage in 1862 and entered the House of Lords. He served under William Ewart Gladstone as Treasurer of the Household in 1874 and as Captain of the Yeomen of the Guard between 1880 and 1885 and in 1886 and was sworn of the Privy Council in 1874. In 1886, he was created Viscount Oxenbridge, of Burton in the County of Lincoln. He again held office under Gladstone as Master of the Horse between 1892 and 1894. From 1880 to 1892 he was Chief Liberal Whip in the House of Lords.

He was appointed Honorary Colonel of the 2nd Surrey Rifle Volunteer Corps and its successor, the 1st Volunteer Battalion, Queen's Royal Regiment (West Surrey), on 18 March 1882.

Family
Lord Oxenbridge married Maria, Dowager Countess of Yarborough, daughter of Cornwallis Maude, 3rd Viscount Hawarden, and widow of Charles Pelham, 2nd Earl of Yarborough, on 7 August 1869. The marriage was childless. She died in December 1897. Lord Oxenbridge only survived her by a few months and died in April 1898, aged 69. As he had no children the viscountcy became extinct on his death, while he was succeeded in the barony by his younger brother, Debonnaire Monson, 8th Baron Monson.

References

External links 
 

1829 births
1898 deaths
Monson, William
Members of the Privy Council of the United Kingdom
Presidents of Surrey County Cricket Club
Monson, William John
Monson, William John
UK MPs who inherited peerages
UK MPs who were granted peerages
Treasurers of the Household
People educated at Windlesham House School
People educated at Eton College
Alumni of Christ Church, Oxford
William
Peers of the United Kingdom created by Queen Victoria